Helen "Leni" Stern (July 4, 1930 – November 11, 2019) was an American sculptor and art patron.

References 

1930 births
2019 deaths
People from Manchester, New Hampshire
Wells College alumni
Smith College alumni
American women sculptors
American art patrons
20th-century American sculptors
21st-century American sculptors
20th-century American philanthropists
20th-century American women artists
21st-century American women artists